The Huangzhou Wind-rain Bridge is a beam bridge over the Wu River in the town of Huangzhou, Xinhuang Dong Autonomous County, Hunan, China.

Name
The name of "Huangzhou" named after the town of "Huangzhou", where the bridge located.

History
Construction of the main body began in March 2011 and was completed in June 2013. Construction of the covered bridge began in June 2013 and was completed in January 2014. It costs more than 29.8 million yuan. Two gateways  and five drum towers  on the bridge. Parapet panels, railing posts  and round Baogu stones are carved in patterns and shapes representing ancient Chinese sculpturing art. The most representative of the bridge railing carvings include Chinese dragons, Qilin, Fenghuang, and birds.

Gallery

References

Bibliography
 

Bridges in Hunan
Bridges completed in 2014
Buildings and structures completed in 2014
2014 establishments in China
Road bridges in China